Chahu (also Romanized as Chāhū) is a village in Mohr Rural District, in the Central District of Mohr County, Fars Province, Iran. At the 2006 census, its population was 754, in 154 families.

References 

Populated places in Mohr County